This page are listed the results of all of the Rio Carnival on year 2014.

Grupo Especial

Série A

Grupo B

Grupo C

Grupo D

References 

2014